Maria Simointytär was a Finnish poet. She is regarded as the first published female poet in Finland. She wrote religious poem ”Orpolapsen vaikerrus”, about the fatherless children, which was published in 1683.

References
 Suomen kansallisbiografia (National Biography of Finland)
 nordicwomensliterature.net

17th-century Finnish women writers
17th-century writers
17th-century Finnish poets
Finnish women poets